= International Conference EEHE =

- EEHE logo

- Location within Europe Location within Germany
- Date: Yearly
- Time: (GMT+2)
- Venue: Bamberg, Germany
- Location: Bamberg; 51.44490200201813°N 7.014148885556525°E
- Also known as: EEHE conference, EEHE exhibition
- Type: Conferences, exhibitions, trade shows
- Target: Electrical engineering, automotive, renewable energy
- Website: eehe.de

The International conference of EEHE (Electrics & Electronics Systems in Hybrid and Electric Vehicles and Electrical Energy Management) is held annually at Germany, since 2012. The event includes trade shows and poster exhibitions.

== Event(s) ==
The 2026 event will be held on 3 to 4 March 2027, at Bamberg, Germany.
